Jack Epps may refer to:

 Jack Epps (American football) (born 1963), former professional American football player
 Jack Epps Jr. (born 1949), American screenwriter, co-writer of Top Gun

See also
 John Epps (1805–1869), English physician, phrenologist, homeopath and political activist